"Take Me Tonight" is a song by German recording artist Alexander Klaws, the winner of the inaugural season of the television competition Deutschland sucht den Superstar. Written and produced by DSDS judge Dieter Bohlen, it was released as both his coronation song and debut single. Upon its release, it debuted at number-one on the German and Swiss Singles Charts. The song was later included on his debut album, Take Your Chance (2003).

Formats and track listings

Credits and personnel
Credits taken from Take Your Chance liner notes. 

 Lyrics, music, production – Dieter Bohlen
 Arrangement – Lalo Titenkov
 Bass – Peter Weihe
 Guitar – Peter Weihe
 Choir – Anja Mahnken, Billy King, Chris Bendorff, Madeleine Lang
 Artwork – Ronald Reinsberg
 Mixing – Jeo

Charts

Weekly charts

Year-end charts

Certifications

References

External links
  
 

Songs about nights
2003 singles
2003 songs
Alexander Klaws songs
Songs written by Dieter Bohlen
Hansa Records singles
Sony BMG singles
Song recordings produced by Dieter Bohlen
Deutschland sucht den Superstar